Chrysops inconspicuus is a species of deer fly in the family Tabanidae.

Distribution
Angola.

References

Tabanidae
Insects described in 1907
Endemic fauna of Angola
Diptera of Africa
Taxa named by Ernest Edward Austen